Cassidy Jacqueline Hutchinson is an American former White House aide and assistant to former Chief of Staff Mark Meadows during the Trump administration.

Hutchinson testified on June 28, 2022, at the public hearings of the United States House Select Committee on the January 6 Attack. She provided testimony on President Donald Trump's conduct and that of his senior aides and political allies before and during the attack on the Capitol on January 6, 2021. Hutchinson's testimony received significant national attention, with several media outlets labeling it as "compelling" and "explosive"; however, she was also subject to severe criticism from conservative allies to Trump.

Early life and education
Raised in Pennington, New Jersey, Hutchinson graduated from Hopewell Valley Central High School in 2015. She studied at Christopher Newport University between 2015 and 2018, graduating in 2019 with  Bachelor of Arts degree in political science and American Studies. Hutchinson describes herself as a "first-generation college student."

Career 
While attending Christopher Newport University, Hutchinson interned for Republican Senator Ted Cruz  during the summer of 2016 and for Republican US House of Representatives whip Steve Scalise during the summer of 2017. In the summer of 2018, she served as an intern in the White House Office of Legislative Affairs. Later, she became an employee of the office.

In March 2020, when Mark Meadows became Trump's fourth chief of staff, he selected her to serve as one of his aides. She soon became Meadows' principal assistant, continuing through to the end of the Trump presidency, where her title was Special Assistant to the President and Coordinator for Legislative Affairs. She worked in an office next to Meadows' office, just down the hall from the Oval Office. She took notes at meetings and traveled with Meadows, monitoring his phone and relaying his orders. She was described as a close confidante of Meadows. Identified as a "White House legislative aide," Hutchinson was the subject of a nationally-syndicated AP photograph in which she was shown dancing to the Village People song "Y.M.C.A." alongside White House press secretary Kayleigh McEnany at the end of Trump's September 21, 2020, campaign rally in Swanton, Ohio.

As Trump's term ended, Trump claims that Hutchinson was supposed to work for his post-presidency operation in Florida, but the plan was "abruptly dropped" before she was supposed to begin.

January 6 Committee testimony

Under subpoena, Hutchinson had given four depositions totaling more than two dozen hours to the committee prior to testifying on live television on June 28, 2022. Prior to her March 7 deposition, she received multiple messages from Trump allies suggesting she demonstrate loyalty to Trump in her testimony. Days before her testimony, she dismissed her attorney, Stefan Passantino, who had deep connections with Trump associates, replacing him with Jody Hunt, a former longtime Justice Department official and chief of staff for Trump's first attorney general, Jeff Sessions. Passantino was the top Trump White House ethics attorney; he denied a suggestion in the December 2022 final January 6 committee report that he had coached Hutchinson and offered her jobs to testify she did not recall certain events though she actually did.

On events leading to January 6 
During the June 28 sworn testimony, Hutchinson testified that she had overheard mention of Oath Keepers and Proud Boys during planning of the Save America March, when Trump's personal attorney Rudy Giuliani was present. Several leaders of both groups were later indicted on seditious conspiracy charges for their alleged roles in the January 6 United States Capitol attack.

Hutchinson testified that both Meadows and Giuliani sought presidential pardons. She previously told the committee in depositions that congressmen Matt Gaetz, Andy Biggs, Scott Perry and Louie Gohmert had also requested pardons.

She testified that on January 3, 2021, White House counsel Pat Cipollone pulled her aside to express his concern upon hearing Trump planned to march to the Capitol with his supporters on January 6; Hutchinson recalled him saying, "We're going to get charged with every crime imaginable if we make that movement happen."

Hutchinson also revealed in her testimony that Trump threw his lunch plate against a wall in a White House dining room on December 1, 2020, when he learned that Attorney General William Barr had made a public statement that he had not discovered any evidence of election fraud. The wall was splashed with ketchup. On other occasions, he had "flip[ped] the tablecloth to let all the contents of the table go onto the floor and likely break or go everywhere".

On January 6 events 
Hutchinson testified that Trump and Meadows were told some individuals were carrying weapons, including firearms, and therefore could not clear magnetometers to enter the rally. Trump insisted that he didn't care if his supporters had weapons and tried to order the magnetometers removed, saying "They're not here to hurt me." The committee played radio transmissions of police warning of people with guns, including AR-15s.

Hutchinson testified she had been told by then-White House deputy chief of staff Tony Ornato that after Trump got into the presidential SUV following his rally, hoping to drive to the Capitol as his supporters marched there, his lead Secret Service agent Robert Engel told him it was too dangerous and informed him they were returning to the White House. Hutchinson said Ornato told her Trump became irate and attempted to grab the steering wheel of the vehicle, and lunged at Engel's clavicles. She testified Engel was present with Ornato as he related the incident but never contradicted the account. CNN reported three days after Hutchinson's testimony that it had spoken with two Secret Service agents who had heard accounts of the incident from multiple other agents since February 2021, including Trump's driver. Although details differed, agents confirmed there was an angry confrontation, with one agent relating that Trump "tried to lunge over the seat — for what reason, nobody had any idea," but no one asserted Trump attacked Engel. A separate Secret Service official told CNN that Engel denied that Trump grabbed at the steering wheel or lunged toward an agent on his detail, and that Ornato denied telling Hutchinson such. Politico reported the same day that Engel told the committee during an early 2022 deposition that he had kept his full account of the incident from his Secret Service colleagues for at least fourteen months. On July 14, 2022, CNN published an account about the corroboration by a Metropolitan Police officer in the motorcade of the "heated exchange" Trump had with his Secret Service detail when they refused to take him to the capitol following his rally on January 6.

As the events of the day unfolded, Hutchinson recalled Cipollone telling Meadows words to the effect of, "Mark, we need to do something more. "They're literally calling for the vice president to be f'ing hung. And Mark had responded something to the effect of, you heard him, Pat. He thinks Mike deserves it. He doesn't think they're doing anything wrong, to which Pat said something, this is f'ing crazy, we need to be doing something more."

An interview transcript released on December 22, 2022 revealed that Hutchinson gave additional testimony on September 14 and September 15, 2022. During part of this testimony, Hutchinson stated that she was pressured by Trump allies not to talk to the committee. She also claimed that with former White House aide Alyssa Farah Griffin acting as her backchannel, she was able to conduct the interview without Passantino's knowledge, and that Passantino in fact wanted her to skirt around the committee questions. Hutchinson testified to the committee that Passantino told her, "We just want to focus on protecting the president" and "We all know you're loyal" and he would help her get "a really good job in Trump world" because "We want to keep you in the family." She also testified Meadows told her Trump knew he had lost the election.

References

External links

Christopher Newport University alumni
Living people
Hopewell Valley Central High School alumni
People from Pennington, New Jersey
Trump administration personnel
New Jersey Republicans
Year of birth missing (living people)